Caroline Wozniacki was the defending champion and successfully defended her title, defeating Anastasia Pavlyuchenkova in the final, 6–0, 7–5. This marked Wozniacki's first title of 2017 and snapped a six-match losing streak in tournament finals.

Seeds

Draw

Finals

Top half

Bottom half

Qualifying

Seeds

Qualifiers

Lucky loser

Qualifying draw

First qualifier

Second qualifier

Third qualifier

Fourth qualifier

References
Main Draw
Qualifying Draw

Toray Pan Pacific Open
Pan Pacific Open
2017 Toray Pan Pacific Open